Leo John Marentette Jr. (February 18, 1941 – May 8, 2014) was an American professional baseball player and relief pitcher in the Major Leagues who played for the Detroit Tigers and the Montréal Expos.
 
In a two-season career, Marentette posted a 4.32 ERA in five pitching appearances, giving up four runs on 10 hits and two walks while striking out one in  innings of work. He did not have a decision or save. He pitched three scoreless innings for the Tigers in September 1965. Then, in 1969, Marentette was recalled from Triple-A to pitch for the Expos during the expansion team's maiden season. He appeared in three games during the Expos' June California road trip, one against each of the three teams based there, and gave up four earned runs in  innings. He left baseball after the 1970 season. He won 74 games during an 11-season minor league career.

On May 8, 2014, Marentette died of a heart attack at the age of 73 at his home in Lambertville, Michigan.

References

External links
Baseball Reference
Baseball Reference (Minors)
Retrosheet
Venezuelan Baseball League

1941 births
2014 deaths
Baseball players from Michigan
American expatriate baseball players in Canada
Buffalo Bisons (minor league) players
Cardenales de Lara players
American expatriate baseball players in Venezuela
Denver Bears players
Detroit Tigers players
Duluth-Superior Dukes players
Durham Bulls players
Florida Instructional League Tigers players
Industriales de Valencia players
Knoxville Smokies players
Major League Baseball pitchers
Montgomery Rebels players
Montreal Expos players
Rocky Mount Leafs players
Syracuse Chiefs players
Toledo Mud Hens players
Vancouver Mounties players
Winnipeg Whips players
People from Lambertville, Michigan